Craig Morgan is an American country music artist. His discography comprises seven studio albums and two greatest hits albums, plus 26 singles. He debuted in 2000 with a self-titled album on Atlantic Records Nashville. After Atlantic closed its Nashville division in 2001, he signed to the independent Broken Bow Records and released three studio albums: I Love It, My Kind of Livin' and Little Bit of Life, released in 2003, 2005 and 2006 respectively. He also released a greatest hits album in 2007 on Broken Bow before leaving the label. In 2008, he signed to BNA Records and released That's Why, which was re-issued in 2009 with three tracks changed. My Kind of Livin' is also his best-selling and highest-charting album, having peaked at number 7 on Top Country Albums and been certified gold by the Recording Industry Association of America.

Morgan's five studio albums have accounted for seventeen singles on the Billboard Hot Country Singles charts. His highest-peaking single is "That's What I Love About Sunday", the only Number One of his career, the first Number One for the Broken Bow label, and the Number One country music single of 2005 on the Billboard Year-End charts. Six more of his singles have reached Top Ten on the country singles charts as well: "Almost Home", "Redneck Yacht Club" (certified gold by the RIAA), "Little Bit of Life", "International Harvester", "Love Remembers" and "Bonfire". A Christmas song, "The Kid in Me", was issued in late 2000 and was never on an album.

Albums

Studio albums

Compilation albums

Extended plays

Singles

2000s

2010s-2020s

Christmas singles

As a featured artist

Music videos

Other album appearances

Notes

References

Morgan, Craig
Morgan, Craig